The Primatial Basilica of the Assumption of the Blessed Virgin Mary and St Adalbert, also known as the Esztergom Basilica, is an ecclesiastic basilica in Esztergom, Hungary, the mother church of the Archdiocese of Esztergom-Budapest, and the seat of the Catholic Church in Hungary. It is dedicated to the Assumption of Saint Mary and Saint Adalbert.

It is the largest church in Hungary. Its inner area is 5,600 m². It is 118 m long and 49 m wide. It has a reverberation time of more than 9 seconds. Its dome, forming a semi-sphere, is situated in the middle, and it has 12 windows. It is 71.5 m high inside (which makes it one of the tallest domes in the world), with a diameter of 33.5 metres, and is 100 m high from outside, the stairs count 400 steps counted from the crypt.

The altarpiece (13.5 × 6.6 metres, depicting the Assumption of the Blessed Virgin Mary, by Girolamo Michelangelo Grigoletti) is the largest painting in the world painted on a single piece of canvas.

The basilica is also known for Bakócz Chapel (named after Tamás Bakócz), built by Italian masters between 1506–1507 out of red marble of Süttő, its walls adorned with Tuscan Renaissance motifs. It is the most precious remaining example of Renaissance art in Hungary.

The huge crypt, built in Old Egyptian style in 1831, is today the resting place of late archbishops, among others, József Mindszenty, famous for his opposition to both Nazi and Communist rule.

History
The building of the present church took place on the foundation of several earlier churches. The first was built by Stephen I of Hungary between 1001–1010 (as the original Saint Adalbert church), the first cathedral in Hungary, which was burned down at the end of the 12th century. It was rebuilt, and even survived the Mongol invasion of Hungary. However, in 1304, Wenceslaus III, a probable candidate for the Hungarian throne, sacked the castle and the church. It was repaired in the following years. The archbishops of the 14th and 15th century made the church more ornate and added a huge library, the second most significant one in the country. It was ruined again under Turkish rule, in 1543. In 1820, the Archdiocese was restored and archbishop Sándor Rudnay decided to restore Esztergom's status as mother church of the country. The church maintains the relics of Catholic martyr and saint Marko Krizin.

The architect was Pál Kühnel and the lead contractor was János Packh. The foundation-stone was laid and work began in 1822. The Bakócz chapel was carefully disassembled (into about 1,600 pieces) and was moved 20 metres away from its original location and attached to the new basilica. In 1838 Packh was murdered, so József Hild was placed in charge of construction. He completed it in Classicistic style. Under the next archbishop, János Scitovszky, the upper church was completed and dedicated on August 31, 1856. The 1856 consecration ceremonies featured the premiere of the Missa solennis zur Einweihung der Basilika in Gran (Gran Mass), composed and conducted by Franz Liszt, and featuring the organist Alexander Winterberger. The final completion of the cathedral took place twelve years later in 1869.

The organ

The renovation and enlargement of the organ started in the 1980s, after extensive preparations, and it is currently in progress. It is supervised by István Baróti, the basilica's organist and choirmaster since 1975. As of 2008, the project is still not fully funded. The organ has five manuals and by 2006 had 85 stops working out of the planned 146. The smallest pipe is 7 mm, ¼ inch (without pipe foot). When complete, it will be the third largest organ in Europe, surpassing all organs in Hungary in both volume and variety of stops.

At the time of the construction in 1856, the organ was the largest in Hungary with 49 stops, 3,530 pipes and 3 manuals. The present organ preserves several stops from the instrument Liszt played.

For the organ's detailed specifications, see the article in the Hungarian Wikipedia.

Burials
József Mindszenty
Tamás Bakócz and his family
Jusztinián György Serédi
Alexander Rudnay
Dénes Szécsi

Gallery

See also
 Dark gate
 Roman Catholicism in Hungary
 List of cathedrals in Hungary
 List of tallest domes

References

External links

 Official web page in multiple languages. (Click on flags in upper right.)
 Lego Basilica

Roman Catholic cathedrals in Hungary
Buildings and structures in Esztergom
19th-century Roman Catholic church buildings in Hungary
Roman Catholic churches completed in 1869
Landmarks in Hungary
Church buildings with domes
Tourist attractions in Komárom-Esztergom County
1869 establishments in Austria-Hungary
Burial sites of the House of Austria-Este